Events in the year 1962 in Norway.

Incumbents
 Monarch – Olav V
 Prime Minister – Einar Gerhardsen (Labour Party)

Events

 7 June – The Nordland Line between Trondheim and Bodø was opened.
 21 October – Hurtigruten passenger ship MS Sanct Svithun running between Bergen and Kirkenes goes in the northbound Hurtigruten, sank during a stormy night after running aground off her normal course, resulting in the deaths of 41 while 48 survived the event.
 5 November – 21 workers were killed in a mine accident in the Kongsfjorden in Svalbard.
 21 December – Rondane National Park is established as Norway's first national park.

Popular culture

Sports

Music

Film

Notable births

January 
 

13 January – Tor Heiestad, sport shooter.
19 January – Erling Landsværk, sailor.
23 January 
 Egil Nyhus, illustrator and editorial cartoonist.
 Svein Nyhus, illustrator and children's writer.
25 January – Kari Kjønaas Kjos, politician.
28 January – Brit Bildøen, writer.

February 
 

 4 February – Håvard Syvertsen, writer.
6 February – Thomas Hylland Eriksen, social anthropologist.
12 February – Stig-Arne Gunnestad, curler.
20 February – Marius Voigt, ice hockey player.
25 February – Elin Ørjasæter, organizational leader, children's writer, columnist, and non-fiction writer.
26 February – Bent Svele, handball player, coach and sports reporter.

March 
2 March – Tom Nordlie, football coach.
5 March – Håvard Tveite, orienteering competitor (died 2021).
11 March – Kjell Berg, curler.
14 March – Vetle Vinje, competition rower.
19 March – Jenny Ellaug Følling, politician.
27 March – Espen Thorsen, rower.
30 March – Marianne S. Bjorøy, politician.

April 
 

5 April – 
Bente Engesland, magazine editor
Arild Monsen, cross-country skier.
19 April 
 Pål Trulsen, curler.
 Trine Trulsen Vågberg, curler.
22 April – Anne Aasheim, editor (died 2016).
25 April – Ole Edvard Antonsen, trumpeter.
27 April – Edvard Moser, professor of psychology and neuroscience.
29 April – Henning Kramer Dahl, poet, essayist and translator (died 2017).

May 
 

4 May 
 Eli Arnstad, politician.
 Marit Arnstad, lawyer and politician
10 May – Arne Lyngstad, politician (died 2019).
15 May – Gro Dahle, poet and writer
18 May – Alf van der Hagen, journalist and newspaper editor.
21 May – Hege Storhaug, journalist and writer.
31 May – Børge Ousland, adventurer.

June 
 

1 June – Marie Simonsen, journalist and editor.
6 June – Tor Arne Bell Ljunggren, politician.
12 June – Petter Skarheim, civil servant.
24 June – Kristian Seip, mathematician.
27 June – Alf Bakken, politician. 
30 June – Lars Lillo-Stenberg, singer, songwriter and guitarist.

July 
 

1 July – Aase Simonsen, politician.
3 July – Heidi Greni, politician.
7 July – Ellen Sofie Olsvik, orienteering competitor.
10 July – Trond Helleland, politician.
16 July – Gøran Sørloth, footballer.
24 July 
 Frank Evensen, judoka.
 Anne Brit Skjæveland, heptathlete.
25 July – Nils Ove Hellvik, footballer.

August 
 

14 August – Per Elvestuen, illustrator.
18 August – Vidar Benjaminsen, ski orienteering competitor.
23 August – Tore Hattrem, diplomat and politician.
29 August – Idar Kreutzer, businessperson.

September 
2 September – Knut Leo Abrahamsen, Nordic combined skier.
4 September – Margunn Ebbesen, politician.
24 September – Ørjan Løvdal, ice hockey player and coach.
29 September – Odd Harald Hovland, politician.

October 
 

5 October – Eli Telhaug, civil servant.
12 October – Jonny Halberg, author and dramatist
13 October – Hans Petter Blad, writer.
15 October – Morten Abel, singer and songwriter.
16 October 
 Elisabeth Aspaker, politician
 Helge Lund, businessperson
28 October – Erik Thorstvedt, footballer.
30 October – Heidi Sundal, handball player.

November 
 

1 November 
 Magne Furuholmen, keyboardist and artist
 Bjarne Håkon Hanssen, politician.
 Lars Helle, journalist and newspaper editor.
3 November – Yngve Slyngstad, former CEO of Norges Bank Investment Management (NBIM).
5 November – Turid Birkeland, politician and cultural executive (died 2015).
9 November – Mette Bergmann, discus thrower.
26 November – Gisken Armand, actress.
28 November – Jon Rønningen, wrestler. 
29 November – Petter Stordalen, businessperson.

December 
8 December – Olaf Kamfjord, jazz musician.
11 December – Ulrich Møller, footballer.
18 December – Dorthe Skappel, television personality and former model

Full date missing
 Liv Holmefjord, civil servant
 Ørnulf Seippel, sociologist

Notable deaths

24 February – Per Skou, international soccer player (b.1891)
22 April – Anders Johanneson Bøyum, politician (b.1890)
8 May – Alfred Madsen, editor, trade unionist and politician (b.1888)
5 June – Hans Eidnes, politician (b.1887)
11 June – Sveinung O. Flaaten, politician (b.1898)
30 July – Johannes Gerckens Bassøe, jurist and civil servant (b.1878)
1 August – Olaf Sørensen, politician (b.1892)
12 August – Vibeke Lunde, sailor (b.1921).
10 October – Trygve Gulbranssen, novelist (b.1894)
29 October – Einar Gundersen, footballer (b.1896)
23 November – Jacob Prytz, goldsmith and designer (born 1886).
7 December – Kirsten Flagstad, opera singer (b.1895)
17 December – Jens Schive, journalist and diplomat (b.1900)
21 December – Asbjørn Bodahl, gymnast (b.1896)
30 December – Olav Bruvik, politician (b.1912)

See also

References

External links